Children are more vulnerable to the effects of climate change than adults. The World Health Organization estimated that 88% of the existing global burden of disease is linked to climate change affecting children under 5 years of age. The Lancet review on health and climate change lists children as the worst-affected category by climate change. Children are also 14–44 percent more likely to die from environmental factors, again leaving them the most vulnerable. Those in urban areas will be affected by lower air quality and overcrowding, and will struggle the most to better their situation.

                                                                                 
Children are physically more vulnerable to climate change in all its forms. Climate change affects the physical health of a child and their well-being. Prevailing inequalities, between and within countries, determines how climate change impacts children. Children have no voice or attention in terms of global responses to climate change.

People living in low-income countries suffer from a higher burden of disease and are less capable of facing climate change threats. Nearly every child in the world is at risk from climate change and pollution. Almost half are at extreme risk.

The Impacts of Climate Change on Children 

Climate Change is not only impacting the future for children, it's affecting their present as well. Children do not have the ability to control their environment and are being disproportionately affected by the effects of Climate Change. Climate Change-related disasters have impacted children in recent years, particularly children from poor communities. Children are experiencing diseases, flooding, pollution and water scarcity all due to Climate Change, particularly in countries of the global South.

Unstable climate conditions such as the use of fossil fuels, deforestation and agriculture decreases access to clean water, food, and destroys secure living environments. Consequently, these systems lead to malnutrition, migration, and poor health, which leaves youth particularly vulnerable. Children are more biologically and psychologically susceptible to these conditions compared to adults due to their ongoing developmental growth. Their systems for detoxification, temperature regulation, and immune responses, and inability to care for themselves leave them far more impacted than adults. Their respiratory systems that are underdeveloped make the pollution caused by fossil fuel pollution that much more dangerous.

Children's mental health is greatly impacted by the effects of global climate change as well. Displacement caused by natural disasters such as increasing amounts of floods, hurricanes and fires leave children experiencing mental health conditions. 71% of middle school aged children and 50% of preschool aged children that experienced Hurricane Katrina experienced post-traumatic stress disorder. The World Health Organization has estimated that children under 5 years of age carry the burden of 88% of global climate change.

Children are affected by destruction of homes, threats to food security, and loss of family livelihoods brought about climate change. The effects on children may be exacerbated by social and economic inequality, armed conflict, and health epidemics. Climate change effects fall under two main dimensions: direct or indirect, instant or postponed. The effects on the child's physical health include: death and injuries, heat diseases, exposure to environmental toxins; infectious, and other illnesses present within warmer temperatures.

There is also a significant increase in mental health and learning issues such as post-traumatic stress disorder (PTSD), depression, and anxiety, sleep disorders, cognitive deficits, and learning difficulties. Given this example about the post food period in Pakistan in 2010, 73% of 10- to 19-year-olds displayed high levels of PTSD, where displaced girls were severely impacted.

Other severe occurrences that were detected were distress, grief, and anger; loss of identity; feelings of helplessness and hopelessness; higher rates of suicide; and increased aggression and violence.

Adding to the physical effects, there are the psychological and mental health influences that are threatening to a child's wellbeing.

Health and wellbeing 
Climate change affect children's health more directly than adults since children's organs and immune systems are still developing and they eat and drink more for their weight. Children's lungs are also more easily damaged by air pollutants since children breathe at a faster rate. Children also face increased risk of pregnancy complications, allergies and asthma, and developmental delays, as well as waterborne diseases.

Children today will also face three times more wildfires, storms, floods, and droughts than their grandparents. Extreme events caused by climate change can destroy homes, schools, child-care centers, and other critical infrastructure. Typhoon Haian flattened entire cities and towns on the islands of Leyte and Samar, Philippines. Many child survivors of Typhoon Haian lost their homes and belongings. In 2020, Typhoon Molave caused floods and landslides that destroyed homes, placing an estimated 2.5 million children in Vietnam at risk. It killed 9 and displaced more than one million individuals in Vietnam and the Philippines.

Climate events have caused severe damage to lives and livelihoods. Typhoons, storm surges, and other disturbances have resulted in loss of assets and capital and declines in family income among farmers, fishers, informal sector workers, and small business owners. Families with more children are more vulnerable to catastrophic out-of-pocket health expenses. After Typhoon Parma hit the Philippines, there was a rise in school dropout rates resulting from the loss of family incomes. Children who continued with school sometimes had to go to class without allowances to buy food. In rural areas, fields, gardens, fishponds, crops, fishing boats, and farming equipment have been destroyed, while livestock have been lost, affecting food security for entire communities.

Environmental impact                                                                       

Children are sensitive to the lack of basic natural resources which is caused by natural phenomena droughts and flooding. Significantly around 160 million children live within extremely high drought regions and over 500 million inhabit areas with extremely high flood occasion. When it comes to the natural phenomenal occurrences, natural disasters lead to displacement of families and children. This displacement is done because of the extreme weather events with increased rates of physical and mental health insecurities.

On the global level, children are estimated to tolerate 88% of the burden of disease because of climate change. Every child is dependent on caregivers and within their communities. The real threat is within the underprivileged areas which are already suffering from environmental; challenges. These will result in various diseases, disabilities, high death rate among children. In 2013, Intergovernmental Panel on Climate Change, assessed that the global temperatures will likely increase to 4.8 °C by 2100 if the current emissions continue to rise. It is important to mention that constant exposure to air pollutants affects the birth weight, small size for gestational age (SGA), and preterm birth cases. Once children are more exposed to air pollution (ozone, particulate matter, sulfur dioxide, or nitrogen dioxide) they tend to suffer from asthma resulting an increase airway oxidative stress and airway inflammation in asthmatic children Air pollution affects a child's neurodevelopment. For this if we come to compare a child born within h a cohort born before the closure of a located coal power plant, a cohort conceived after plant closure had significantly lower cord blood levels of PAH–DNA adducts and higher levels of brain-derived neurotrophic factor (BDNF), a protein needed in early brain development. This is where the risk lies.

Climate change action by children

School strike for climate

Legal action 

Juliana v. United States was dismissed in 2020 on the grounds that the plaintiffs lacked standing to sue, but a new case has been launched on narrower grounds. In the case "Duarte Agostinho and Others v. Portugal and Others" brought by children and young adults the European Court of Human Rights has asked 33 states to respond by May 2021 with information on how they are trying to limit climate change.

Arts Based Educational Approaches 

By using Arts-based approach this keeps the daunting topic of Climate Change fun and engaging for children. It's important to take the child's perspective into consideration when thinking about how we deliver difficult topics. Many schools have implemented curriculum around climate change that can be educational and age appropriate. Some examples of youth curriculum around climate change and it's impacts:

Terrarium: How greenhouse gasses work

Composting: focus on food waste

Gardening: understanding agricultural footprint

Art with recycled material: learning to work with what we have already

Papermaking: learning innovation, resourcefulness

All of these projects create an innate connection to Each that will stick with children as they grow older. The goal isn't to scare them, as much as it is to help them build a foundation of understanding what's possible around healing and maintaining a healthy planet.

It is important to integrate climate change within the curriculum. Once children learn about the existence and the demanding urgency of the global environmental problems around them, they become more aware and engaged towards improving the world's environmental status.

Arts help children's in different developmental aspects. By encouraging in having meaningful self-expression with respect to any ideas, climate change here, they are offered a medium to develop a sustainable resolutions towards their community and the globe. It is noted that once there is a strong relation between kids and their parents, the latter's perception of issues could be affected through their kid's efforts.  The more children's communicate climate change issues, the better the awareness it could be created among both. So, fostering this friendly communicative attitude has a positive effect on the parental perception and action later.

Global initiatives 

A number of global initiatives and projects had been launched to address the impact and challenges of climate change on children.

Youth activists on climate change 

Youth activism needs to be supported and advocated to reduce the impact of global climate change on children.

 Mari Copeny 
 Xiye Bastida
 Autumn Peltier 
 Xiuhtezcatl Martinez
 Lesein Mutunkei (Q115776605)
 Ella and Caitlin McEwan
 Leah Namugerwa 
Ridhima Pandey 
Isra Hirsi
Yusuf Baluch
Sarah Goody
Mai Thi Thuan
Devishi Jha
Over 4,500 children and young people have participated in annual United Nations Environment Programme Tunza International Conferences since 2004. Children that represent over 100 countries and have covered a multitude of issues concerning climate change. Including green jobs and a green economy. Involving youth in conversations around our climate adds a level of diversity and a shared understanding of how climate change affects different communities and age groups.

The voices of our youth need to be heard and supported. They need to feel like they have control and that their views and opinions make an impact and matter. Giving the youth the opportunity to be heard in political systems and are given the floor, ability to perform speeches not only shares the importance of how children are being impacted by climate change, but it also prepares them for a future of political involvement. Allowing our youth to be involved in public speaking prepares them for future jobs, creates a foundation for public speaking, confidence, and a sense of control over their future. Too often children are being told and it's important to give the youth the opportunity to tell us.

References 

Children
Climate change and society